Enrique José Alejandro Candioti (born May 23, 1936 in Santa Fe, Argentina) was a Member (1997-2016) and Chairman of the United Nations International Law Commission, former Secretary of State for Foreign Affairs and Legal Adviser of the Argentine Foreign Ministry, former Ambassador to the United States of America, Germany, Australia and New Zealand. He served as a career diplomat of Argentina for 51 years between 1955 and 2006. Specializations: public international law, law of the sea, territorial and boundary matters, international arbitration.
From 2001 to 2006 he was Argentine Ambassador to Germany.

Sources
106th Annual Report, Permanent Court of Arbitration, 2006 - http://www.pca-cpa.org
 UN General Assembly press release GA/11175 - http://www.un.org/News/Press/docs/2011/ga11175.doc.htm

Argentine diplomats
1936 births
Living people
International Law Commission officials
Ambassadors of Argentina to the United States
Ambassadors of Argentina to Germany
Ambassadors of Argentina to Australia
Ambassadors of Argentina to New Zealand
Argentine officials of the United Nations